The France–Germany football rivalry is one of the biggest and most heated association football rivalries in Europe, between two European sides, France and Germany, two of the most successful national teams in the world. Previously, it was mostly a one-sided phenomenon since most German fans consider the Netherlands, England, or Italy to be their traditional footballing rivals until the rise of France from 1990s onward, but the rivalry really began during the UEFA European Championships in the 2010s decade after a series of mere friendlies in the 1990s to 2000s.

Background

The root of France–Germany rivalry could have dated back from the old tensions between France and German Empire after the capture of Paris by Prussian Army in 1870. Since the end of the war, enmity between France and Germany increased, resulted with military arm race and eventually, set up the World War I. During the beginning of war, a peaceful moment, the Christmas truce, where a peaceful football match between French, British and German soldiers occurred. This was considered the first unofficial match between France and Germany.

The counries first played each other in an official international in 1931 when France defeated the Weimar Republic. However, rivalry soon increased with the German invasion of France, and antagonism persisted until the end of World War II. One of the most notable meetings between the two countries came in the 1982 World Cup semi-final, which ended 3–3 after extra time before West Germany won in apenalty shoot-out. Michel Platini himself declared the match as his "most beautiful game".

Matches

Statistics

All-time top goalscorers

Overall record

See also
France–Germany relations

References

External links
Germany vs. France: Five of the best clashes between the two countries

France national football team rivalries
Germany national football team rivalries
football
International association football rivalries